Trupanea furcifera is a species of tephritid or fruit flies in the genus Trupanea of the family Tephritidae.

Distribution
Ethiopia, Kenya, Zimbabwe, Malawi, Madagascar, South Africa.

References

Tephritinae
Insects described in 1924
Diptera of Africa